Mpls or MPLS may refer to:
 Minneapolis, Minnesota, a city in the United States
 Multiprotocol Label Switching, a data-carrying mechanism in computer networking